Cathedral of the Divine Saviour, located in the center of Ostrava, is the second largest Roman Catholic cathedral in Moravia and Silesia (after the basilica in Velehrad near Uherské Hradiště). This three-nave Neo-Renaissance basilica with a semi-circular apse and two 67m high towers is dating since 1889 (building started in 1883). The church was designed by Gustav Meretta, the official architect of the Archbishop of Olomouc, and the interior by Max von Ferstel.

The main nave is 14 m wide and 22 m high, the two side aisles are 7 m wide and 10 m high each. The seating capacity of the cathedral is 4,000 people. On May 30, 1996 Pope John Paul II established the Diocese of Ostrava-Opava, and soon after the basilica has been dignified into a cathedral. In 1998, a new neo-Baroque organ was installed.

History
On 23 May 1871 the city council spoke about the intention of building a new parish church, which would eventually replace the old parish church of St Wenceslas. The old church could not contain the increasing number of believers and failed to comply with official requirements for public buildings. After a fire inspection took place on 2 January 1882, the district marshal in Místek decided to build a new church. Thus, at a council meeting on 5 October 1882 the agreements for the construction of a new parish church were done. 
 
The foundation stone was laid by Mayor Anton Lux and the Reverend Josef Spurný on October 4, 1883. AT that time church committees were competing in Moravia which was established under provincial laws dating from 1864 and 1874. It was the supervisory and executive bodies, which were often the purchaser of furniture projects and new churches, significantly encroached into their final form. Their arguments focused, in particular, on situations where the parish volume was small. The church of the Divine Saviour would serve 4 municipalities which, upon its construction, should contribute a proportionate financial amount. However these villages managed their own parish church and, therefore Ostravanians' contributions to the construction of the church were often the cause of discord. Other financial flow was rather paradoxical. The Archdiocese of Olomouc, who took patronage of the church, was obliged, by patronage law, to pay a third of construction costs, worth just under 33,000 florins. Contributions also flowed in from Jewish entrepreneurs, like Baron Rotschild and the Gutmannové brothers.

See also

 List of cathedrals in the Czech Republic

Buildings and structures in Ostrava
Tourist attractions in the Moravian-Silesian Region
Roman Catholic cathedrals in the Czech Republic
19th-century Roman Catholic church buildings in the Czech Republic
Churches in Ostrava